Olivier J. LeBlanc (November 27, 1830 – December 14, 1919) was a Canadian politician of Acadian descent.

Born in Memramcook, New Brunswick,  the son of Joseph LeBlanc and Victorie B. Girouard, LeBlanc was educated at Common Schools. A farmer, he was elected to the Legislative Assembly of New Brunswick in 1882. His election in 1882 was protested but he was reelected in a by-election held later that year. Leblanc subsequently was a Minister without portfolio in the Executive Council from 1889 to 1891. He ran unsuccessfully for a federal seat in 1891 and was then named to the Legislative Council of New Brunswick.

LeBlanc was first elected to the House of Commons of Canada for the riding of Kent in the general elections of 1900. A Liberal, he was re-elected in 1904 and 1908.

Electoral record

References
 
The Canadian parliamentary companion, 1891, JA Gemmill
 The Canadian Parliament; biographical sketches and photo-engravures of the senators and members of the House of Commons of Canada. Being the tenth Parliament, elected November 3, 1904

1830 births
1919 deaths
Liberal Party of Canada MPs
Members of the House of Commons of Canada from New Brunswick
New Brunswick Liberal Association MLAs
Members of the Executive Council of New Brunswick
Acadian people
People from Westmorland County, New Brunswick
New Brunswick Liberal Association MLCs